Lewis Francis Brest (May 15, 1842 - December 2, 1915) was an American soldier who received the Medal of Honor for valor during the American Civil War.

Biography
Brest served in the American Civil War in the 57th Pennsylvania Infantry for the Union Army. He received the Medal of Honor on May 10, 1865 for his actions at the Battle of Sailor's Creek.

Medal of Honor citation
Rank and organization: Private, Company D, 57th Pennsylvania Infantry. Place and date: At Sailors Creek, Va., 6 April 1865. Entered service at:------. Birth: Mercer, Pa. Date of Issue: 10 May 1865.

Citation:

Capture of flag.

See also

List of American Civil War Medal of Honor recipients: A-F

References

External links

Military Times

1842 births
1915 deaths
Union Army soldiers
United States Army Medal of Honor recipients
People of Pennsylvania in the American Civil War
American Civil War recipients of the Medal of Honor
People from Mercer, Pennsylvania